Roque Moya (born 10 February 1953 in Gorafe) is a Spanish former professional cyclist.

Major results
1976
 1st Stage 4 Vuelta a Asturias
1978
 1st Stage 4 Tour of the Basque Country
1979
 1st Overall Vuelta a Aragón
 1st Stage 2 Costa del Azahar
1980
 1st Stage 1b Vuelta a Cantabria
 4th Trofeo Masferrer

References

1953 births
Living people
Spanish male cyclists
Sportspeople from the Province of Granada
Cyclists from Andalusia